EB-2 or EB2 may refer to:
EB-2 visa, a U.S. immigrant visa preference category
Gibson EB-2, an electric bass guitar 
EB2, a Honda E engine
EBII, the Ford Falcon (EB) Series II, a car
Bazzocchi EB.2, a glider
UR GC class, later known as the UR/KUR EB2 class, locomotives
EB2, or MAPRE2, a protein
Europa Barbarorum II, a PC game

See also
EB-1 (disambiguation)